Terry McMillan (born October 18, 1951) is an American novelist. Her work centers around the experiences of Black women in the United States.

Early life
McMillan was born in Port Huron, Michigan. She received a B.A. in journalism in 1977 from the University of California, Berkeley. She also attended the Master of Fine Arts program in film at Columbia University.

Career
McMillan's first book, Mama, was published in 1987. Unsatisfied with her publisher's limited promotion of Mama, McMillian promoted her own debut novel by writing thousands of booksellers, particularly African-American bookstores, and the book soon sold out of its initial first hardcover printing of 5,000 copies.

McMillan achieved national attention in 1992 with her third novel, Waiting to Exhale. The book remained on The New York Times bestseller list for many months and by 1995 it had sold more than three million copies. The novel contributed to a shift in Black popular cultural consciousness and the visibility of a female Black middle-class identity in popular culture. McMillan was credited with having introduced the interior world of Black women professionals in their thirties who are successful, alone, available, and unhappy. In 1995, the novel was adapted into a film of the same title, directed by Forest Whitaker and starring Whitney Houston, Angela Bassett, Loretta Devine, and Lela Rochon.

In 1998, another of McMillan's novels, How Stella Got Her Groove Back, was adapted into a film by the same name starring Angela Bassett and Taye Diggs.

McMillan's novel Disappearing Acts was subsequently produced as a direct-to-cable feature by the same name in 2000, starring Wesley Snipes and Sanaa Lathan and directed by Gina Prince-Bythewood.  In 2014, Lifetime brought McMillan's A Day Late and a Dollar Short to television audiences, starring Whoopi Goldberg and an ensemble cast featuring Ving Rhames, Tichina Arnold, Mekhi Phifer, Anika Noni Rose, and Kimberly Elise.  McMillan also wrote The Interruption of Everything (2006) and Getting to Happy (2010), the sequel to Waiting to Exhale.

Personal life
McMillan married Jonathan Plummer in 1998, who came out as gay during their marriage. In March 2005, she filed for divorce.

On July 13, 2012, she sold her 7,000 square feet home in Danville, California, before moving to Los Angeles, California.

McMillan has one child, a son, Solomon.

Works

(Editor) 

Waiting to Exhale played an instrumental part in promoting a more honest, reflective representation of contemporary black womanhood and played an instrumental role in creating a dialogue in R&B music that was relatable to black women. Her book discussed the everyday needs as well as the sexual desires and pleasures of women that had largely been missing to that point. Daphne A. Brooks argues in her piece "Its not right but its okay" that McMillan's work informed and influenced the woman-centered R&B movement that has become very popular today. In today's R&B artists such as a SZA, Summer Walker, Jazmine Sullivan, among many others articulate the experiences of black women, which is a trend that was jumpstarted by the work of McMillan and the R&B artists who innovated the genre.

 Who Asked You? Viking, September 2013.

References

Sources
Nishikawa, Kinohi. "Romance Novel." Hans Ostrom and J. David Macey Jr. (eds), The Greenwood Encyclopedia of African American Literature. Westport, CT: Greenwood Press, 2005. pp. 1411–15.

External links
 Official Web Site
Interview with Terry McMillan on the Tavis Smiley Show.

Terry McMillan at the African American Literature Book Club

1951 births
Living people
20th-century American novelists
21st-century American novelists
African-American novelists
American women novelists
People from Port Huron, Michigan
University of California, Berkeley alumni
Novelists from Michigan
20th-century American women writers
21st-century American women writers
Columbia University School of the Arts alumni
American Book Award winners
Women anthologists
20th-century African-American women writers
20th-century African-American writers
21st-century African-American women writers
21st-century African-American writers